Operation Acrobat was a proposed British attack on Tripoli in 1942. It was discussed on 9 and 13 January 1942 by the Chiefs of Staff and representatives of Middle East Command (General Sir Claude Auchinleck). The Chief of Imperial General Staff, General Alan Brooke, wondered if the operation "was on" because of the delays in the capture of Cyrenaica because it could not be carried out for six weeks, during which Axis reinforcements could flow into Africa from Italy. Brooke had a low opinion of Auchinleck's staff, though not of Auchinleck; the situation in the Far East was already serious. The planning of Operation Acrobat is depicted by a propaganda film Tunisian Victory (1944). The similar Operation Torch was later successful.

References 

Cancelled military operations involving the United Kingdom
Cancelled military operations of World War II
North African campaign
Military history of Libya